Bondi could refer to:

Places in Australia

New South Wales
 Bondi, New South Wales, a suburb of Sydney, Australia
 Bondi Beach, a beach and suburb of Sydney, Australia
 Bondi Junction, a suburb and commercial centre in Sydney, Australia
 North Bondi, a suburb of Sydney, Australia

Northern Territory
 Little Bondi, Northern Territory, a suburb in the Gove Peninsula, Northern Territory

Other
 Bondi (name), surname
 BONDI (OMTP), an Open Mobile Terminal Platform initiative, a widget framework for AJAX applications, aimed at mobile devices

See also
 Bondi Beach (disambiguation)
 Bondy, commune in Paris
 Egon Bondy, Czech philosopher and poet